Ebi Theopillus Sukore (born 27 October 1983) is a Nigerian footballer who plays as a midfielder for Mumbai F.C. in the I-League.

References

Nigerian footballers
1983 births
Living people
I-League players
Mumbai FC players
Shillong Lajong FC players
Persis Solo players
PSIS Semarang players
Semen Padang F.C. players
Persik Kediri players
Nigerian expatriate footballers
Nigerian expatriate sportspeople in India
Nigerian expatriate sportspeople in Indonesia
Expatriate footballers in India
Expatriate footballers in Indonesia
Association football midfielders
Association football forwards